Salsarita's Fresh Mexican Grill is a chain of fast casual Tex Mex restaurants in the United States serving Mexican-style cuisine. Restaurant service consists of: dine-in, take-out, online ordering, 3rd Party Delivery with some locations offering Drive Thru options. The company is headquartered in Charlotte, North Carolina, and operates over 80 company-owned and franchised restaurants throughout United States.

History 
The chain was founded in 2000 by Bruce Willette.  It was purchased by Phil Friedman in 2011.  Friedman has rapidly expanded the number of Salsarita's, claiming that to achieve success, "It's finding the best operations person and then together growing and increasing same-store sales."  Friedman has stated that he wants to grow Salsarita's into a super regional chain.

Menu 
Salsarita's menu consists of six core items: burritos, bowls, quesoritos (A burrito stuffed with your favorite fillings and covered with Salsarita’s Creamy Queso), tacos, quesadillas, and salads. The price of each item is based on the choice of Grilled Chicken, Ground Beef, Grilled Steak, Shredded Pork, Sautéed Shrimp, and Fajita Vegetables.  There are seven made fresh daily salsas: Mild Salsa, Hot Salsa, Medium Salsa, Pico de Gallo, Tomatillo Salsa Verde, and Pueblo Corn Salsa, and Creamy Cholula Corn. Additional optional, fresh toppings are offered including rice, beans, shredded lettuce, diced tomatoes, diced onions, cilantro, black olives, diced jalapenos, pickled jalapenos, shredded cheese, sour cream, creamy Queso, and house made fresh guacamole.

Most Salsarita's locations offer a variety of beer and wine, with a few having full-sized bars. In 2014, the chain worked with PuckerButt Pepper of South Carolina to create the "World's Hottest Burrito" using Carolina Reaper peppers.

Catering 
Most Salsarita's locations offer Catering that can either be delivered or picked up. Catering options include Taco Bars, Fajita Bars, Taco Salad Bars, Nacho Bars, Burrito Boxed Lunches, Taco Salad Boxed Lunches and Salsarita's signature Fiesta Packs.

References

External links
Official website

Fast casual restaurants
Mexican-American cuisine
Mexican restaurants in the United States
Companies based in Charlotte, North Carolina
Fast-food chains of the United States
Fast-food franchises
Fast-food Mexican restaurants
Restaurant chains in the United States
Cuisine of the Western United States
Restaurants established in 2000
Restaurants in North Carolina
American companies established in 2000
Tex-Mex restaurants